Bernhardt Hilbrand Edskes (28 October 1940 – 21 September 2022) was a Dutch-Swiss organist, organologist, and organ builder based in Wohlen.

Life 
Edskes was born to Albert Hendrik Edskes, chief clerk at the court in Groningen, and Gritje (from Marguerite) de Graaf, and grew up in Groningen as the youngest of four musical brothers. He received piano and organ lessons from the first grade onwards and became assistant organist at the organ at the Dorpskerk at Noordbroek at the age of 13 and principal organist at the Organ in the Jacobikerk at Uithuizen at the age of 15. In addition to music, he was also interested in painting and drawing, which he deepened at the Groningen Academy of Fine Arts.

As a result of the North Sea flood of 1953, numerous new organs had to be built in the Netherlands, for which the Swiss company Metzler received orders. Edskes designed several new organs for this firm. In 1963, he moved to Switzerland and became artistic director for exterior design and tonal conception at Metzler. In 1966, he married Doris Edskes née Utzinger Alber, a federally certified structural draughtswoman, with whom he has two daughters. After working for Metzler for twelve years, he set up his own workshop in Wohlen in 1975.

For years, Edskes was chairman of the Swiss Association of Organists and lecturer in organ building at the Schola Cantorum Basiliensis and at the Zurich University of the Arts. He gives concerts throughout Europe, lectures on organ building and has recorded various CDs.

Work 
Edskes was known for his consistent restoration practice and reconstructions of Renaissance and Baroque organs, However, he restored 19th-century organs and realised independent new buildings. As for his brother, the Groningen organologist Cor Edskes, the work of Arp Schnitger forms the focus and conceptual orientation for quite a few of his new buildings. Characteristic of Edskes' historicising new organs is the completely uniform Intonation. He considers it pseudo-romantic to deliberately incorporate irregularities in order to make an organ appear older. Edskes also built stringed keyboard instruments such as harpsichords and clavichords.

List of realisations (selection) 
The size of the instruments is indicated in the fifth column by the number of manuals and the number of sounding stops in the sixth column. A capital "P" stands for an independent pedal, a small "p" for an attached pedal.

References

Further reading 
 Hermann J. Busch: Edskes, Bernhardt. In Hermann J. Busch, Matthias Geuting (ed.): Lexikon der Orgel. Laaber-Verlag, Laaber 2007, .
 Bernhardt Edskes: Die Rekonstruktion der gotischen Schwalbennest-Orgel in der Predigerkirche zu Basel. In Basler Jahrbuch für historische Musikpraxis. Vol. 11, 1987, .
 
 Hans Fidom: Orgelklank en orgeldenken. De wereld van Bernhardt Edskes. In . Jg. 100, No. 2, 2004,  (engl. summary).
 Gerhard Ropeter: Bernhardt Hilbrand Edskes – Orgeln sind sein Leben. In Herbert Heere among others (ed.): Die Edskes-Orgel in St. Mauritius. Festschrift zur Weihe der Edskes-Orgel in St. Mauritius Hardegsen. Orgelbauverein St. Mauritius Hardegsen, Hardegsen 1996, .
 Dirk Trüten, Sietze de Vries (ed.): Orgelbaukunst. Festschrift für Bernhardt Edskes zum 80. Geburtstag. Verlag Buch & Netz, Kölliken 2020, .

External links 
 
 Interview mit Bernhardt Edskes über Arp Schnitger (in Dutch)
 

1940 births
2022 deaths
Dutch pipe organ builders
People from Groningen (province)